was a feudal domain in Edo period Japan, located in Dewa Province (modern-day Akita Prefecture), Japan. It was centered on Honjō Castle in what is now the city of Yurihonjō, Akita.

History
Much of Dewa Province was controlled by the powerful Mogami clan during the Sengoku period. The Mogami established a subsidiary holding centered on Honjō Castle in the center of the Yuri region of central Dewa Province in 1610. However, the Mogami were dispossessed by the Tokugawa shogunate in 1622, with the majority of their holdings going to the Satake clan, who were transferred from Hitachi Province to the much smaller holding of Kubota Domain.

Rokugō Masanori, a relatively minor samurai from Senboku Country in Dewa Province served Toyotomi Hideyoshi at the Battle of Odawara in 1590 and was confirmed in his ancestral holdings of 4,500 koku  in Dewa Province. He sided with Tokugawa Ieyasu at the Battle of Sekigahara against his nominal overlords, the Onodera clan, and was promoted to the status of a 10,000 koku daimyō, based at Hitachi-Fuchū Domain,  with his holdings scattered between Dewa and Hitachi Provinces. When the Mogami clan was dispossessed, the Tokugawa shogunate transferred him in 1623 from Hitachi to the newly created Honjō Domain, and increased his revenues to 20,000 koku, which were all consolidated in the form of 103 villages in Yuki County where his descendants ruled for 11 generations to the Meiji Restoration.

The domain has a population of 23,911 people in 3784 households per the 1674 census. It was 11-days travel time from Edo, where the clan maintained its primary residence (kamiyashiki) at Kita-Inari-cho, in Shitaya. The clan's Edo temple was Tessho-ji in Nishi-Asakusa.

During the Boshin War, the final daimyō of Honjō Domain, Rokugō Masakane sided with the Ōuetsu Reppan Dōmei; however, the domain had scant military resources and was quickly overrun by forces of the pro-Imperial Satchō Alliance, which destroyed Honjō Castle. The new Meiji government reinstated him as domain governor in 1868, but halved his revenues to 10,000 koku. With the abolition of the han system in July 1871, and the absorption of Honjō Domain into Akita Prefecture, Rokugō Masakane relocated to Tokyo. In 1884, he and his descendants were granted the title of viscount (shishaku) in the kazoku peerage.

List of daimyōs
  Rokugō clan (tozama) 1623–1871

Further reading

Sasaki Suguru (2004). Boshin Sensō 戊辰戦争. Tokyo: Chuokōron-shinsha.

External links
 [www.asahi-net.or.jp/~me4k-skri/han/mutudewa/honjou.html] Honjō on "Edo 300 HTML"

Notes

Domains of Japan
1623 establishments in Japan
States and territories established in 1623
1871 disestablishments in Japan
States and territories disestablished in 1871
Dewa Province
History of Akita Prefecture
Ōuetsu Reppan Dōmei